Puran Chand Joshi (14 April 1907 – 9 November 1980), one of the early leaders of the communist movement in India. He was the general secretary of the Communist Party of India from 1935 to 1947.

Early years
Joshi was born on 14 April 1907, in a Kumaoni Hindu Brahmin family of Almora, in Uttarakhand. His father Harinandan Joshi was a teacher. In 1928, he passed his M.A. examination from the Allahabad University. He was arrested soon after completion of postgraduation. He became a leading organizer of the Youth Leagues during 1928-29, along with Jawaharlal Nehru, Yusuf Meherally and others.  Soon, he became the General secretary of the Workers and Peasants Party of Uttar Pradesh, formed at Meerut in October 1928. In 1929, at the age of 22, the British Government arrested him as one of the suspects of the Meerut Conspiracy Case. The other early communist leaders who were arrested along with him included Shaukat Usmani, Muzaffar Ahmed, S.A. Dange and S.V. Ghate.

Joshi was given six years of transportation to the penal settlement of Andaman Islands. Considering his age, the punishment was later reduced to three. After his release in 1933, Joshi worked towards bringing a number of groups under the banner of the Communist Party of India (CPI). In 1934 the CPI was admitted to the Third International or Comintern.

As the General Secretary

After the sudden arrest of Somnath Lahiri, then Secretary of CPI, during end-1935, Joshi became the new General Secretary. He thus became the first general secretary of Communist Party of India, for a period from 1935 to 1947. At that time the left movement was steadily growing and the British government banned communist activities from 1934 to 1938. In February 1938, when the Communist Party of India started in Bombay its first legal organ, the National Front, Joshi became its editor. The Raj re-banned the CPI in 1939, for its initial anti-War stance. When, in 1941, Nazi Germany attacked the Soviet Union, the CPI proclaimed that the nature of the war has changed to a people's war against fascism.

Ideological-political hegemony and cultural renaissance
An outstanding contribution of PC Joshi
to the theory and practice of Communist
movement was his initiation of politico-
ideological hegemony and cultural
renaissance. One rightly talks of Gramsci’s
contributions, but PCJ’s contributions have
not been given proper attention; they left
deep imprint on mass consciousness. Even
today people become Communist or demo-
crats when they delve deep into political,
ideological and cultural contributions of
his time.

PC Joshi, firstly, rendered political move-
ment of his times revolutionary as none else.
His slogan of ‘National Front’ against im-
perialism, colonialism and fascism fully
accorded with times and aspirations of
educated masses. People were attracted in
huge numbers to Communist Party even
if they all did not join it. Students, youth,
teachers, professionals, artists, enlightened
bourgeoisie and many others accepted
aspects of Marxism in their broadest mean-
ing.

During his leadership, Communists
transformed the Congress into a broad front
with strong left influence. Formation of CSP,
WPP, Left Consolidation and joint mass
organizations radicalized vast sections of
conscious people far beyond the confines
of the CPI. Key policy making centres were
operated by the Communists, such as on
industry and agriculture. Several PCCs
were directly led or participated in by Communists such as Sohan Singh Josh, S. A. Dange, S. V. Ghate, S. S. Mirajkar, Malayapuram Singaravelu, Z.A. Ahmed,
etc. there were at least 20 Communists in
the AICC, establishing a working relationship with Mahatma Gandhi, Nehru, Bose
and others. Influence of Marxism spread far
beyond Communist movement, and was
broadly accepted as the most advanced
ideology, though interpretations varied. In
fact Marxism became a ‘fashion’. By the end
of 1930s and early ‘40s, huge number of
people converted to Marxism, leaving a
deep imprint on ideology of the national
movement: Congress, CSP, HSRA, Ghadar,
Chittagong group etc. Marxism won ideo-
logical victories. Congress almost became
a left organization after the election of
Subhash Bose as Congress president, much
of whose credit should go to PC Joshi. If Bose
had not left Congress, perhaps we would
have seen a different Congress at the time
of freedom.

Secondly, art and culture were given a
mass democratic and revolutionary form
by PCJ. Songs, drama, poetry, literature,
theatre, cinema etc became vehicle of mass
consciousness and radicalization. The
printed word became mass force. All this
created a renaissance on the national scene.
Their deep effects can be seen long after freedom. Communists were the first to use these media on such scale with telling impact.

Important figures filled the socio-cul-
tural scene in literature, art, culture, films
etc, radicalizing generations. CPI, IPTA,
PWA,AISF etc inspired real progressive
movements. Many youths became Commu-
nists reading Premchand’s and Rahul’s
books and participating in mass culture.
Communist Party exercised considerable
ideological and cultural hegemony, even
though it was relatively small. There is much
contemporary lesson.

Culture became an effective means to
politicize and awaken the masses.

PCJ effortlessly combined political cul-
ture of the masses with national aspirations.

First CPI congress, 1943
The congress was as much a cultural
event as it was political. Vast number of non-party people joined the proceedings and
waited for results. PCJ’s speech was eagerly
awaited and heard with rapt attention.

Multi-faceted struggles
Joshi was a man of masses and knew when
to move and what slogans to give. His work
in Bengal famine is unparalleled. IPTA was
born of it. His analysis of roots of famine
is profoundly scientific Marxist. His correspondence with Mahatma Gandhi
convinced the ‘Father of the Nation’ of many
views of the Communists.

It is often presented as
if PCJ was a compromiser, a class
collaborationist. This
view is a legacy of the
B.T. Ranadive period when he was
much maligned.

PCJ not
only led peaceful mass
struggles and the party
in various elections including those of 1946; he
also led the party successfully in armed
struggles. It was during
his leadership that
armed struggles like
those of Kayyur,
Punnapra-Vayalar, RIN
revolt, Tebhaga and
Telangana took place.
This is sought to be underplayed. It was he who
gave the green signal for
the Telangana armed
struggle in 1946, as part
of anti-Nizam struggle and not as part of socialist revolution in India.
The two are different.

During his stewardship, several
Communists were sent to
the legislatures, even
though voting was highly
restricted.

Expulsion and rehabilitation
In the post-freedom period, the Communist Party of India, after the second congress in Calcutta (new spelling: Kolkata) adopted a path of taking up arms. Joshi was advocating unity with Indian National Congress under the leadership of Jawaharlal Nehru. He was severely criticized in the Calcutta congress of the CPI in 1948 and was removed from the general secretaryship. Subsequently, he was suspended from the Party on 27 January 1949, expelled in December 1949 and readmitted to the Party on 1 June 1951. Gradually he was sidelined, though rehabilitated through making him the editor of the Party weekly, New Age. After the Communist Party of India split, he was with the CPI. Though he explained the policy of the CPI in the 7th congress in 1964, he was never brought in the leadership directly.

Last days
In his last days, he kept himself busy in research and publication works in Jawaharlal Nehru University to establish an archive on the Indian communist movement.

Personal life
In 1943, he married Kalpana Datta (1913–1995), a revolutionary, who participated in the Chittagong armoury raid. They had two sons, Chand and Suraj. Chand Joshi (1946-2000) was a noted journalist, who worked for the Hindustan Times. He was also known for his work, Bhindranwale: Myth and Reality (1985). Chand's second wife Manini (née Chatterjee, b 1961) is also a journalist, who works for The Telegraph. Manini Chatterjee penned a book on the Chittagong armoury raid, titled, Do and Die: The Chittagong Uprising 1930-34 (1999).

See also
Kumaon
Kumauni People

References

Further reading
 Chakravartty, Gargi (2007). P.C. Joshi: A Biography, New Delhi: National Book Trust, .

External links
 The Hindu report on P.C. Joshi denying split in CPI
 Biography of Puran Chand Joshi

1907 births
Communist Party of India politicians from Uttarakhand
People from Almora
Indian independence activists from Uttarakhand
1980 deaths
Indian communists
Indian independence activists
Prisoners and detainees of British India